Kim Kang-woo (born July 11, 1978) is a South Korean actor. He is best known from his roles in The Taste of Money and The Missing.

Career
Kim Kang-woo majored in Theater and Film at Chung-Ang University. In early, Kim work as singer in 1998. In 2001, Kim made his acting debut in SBS TV Movie's and MBC Serie's Wuri's Family as bit part. Next Year, Kim make his first acting debut in Movie The Coast Guard while still a senior, later commenting that the role of a soldier was the only one he could get without any prior experience. Subsequent roles in the drama series Breathless and Three Leafed Clover earned Kim the nickname "Mr. Right" as he became known for his portrayal of honest and diligent characters. His first leading film role was in Jeong Jae-eun's 2005 sophomore feature The Aggressives, for which he and co-star Chun Jung-myung were the co-recipients of the "Best New Actor" award at the 6th Busan Film Critics Awards.

In 2007, Kim starred in Park Heung-sik's The Railroad, which told the story of two strangers who reveal their inner pain to each other when they are stranded at the last railway station before the Korean Demilitarized Zone. Kim was upset when the film was only released in ten theaters, and went to screenings by himself in an effort to promote the film, where he greeted and conversed with members of the audience. In spite of its poor box office performance, The Railroad found favour with critics, and Kim won the "Best Actor" award at the 25th Torino Film Festival. Although happy to win the award, Kim found it more gratifying to observe Italian audiences responding to the film in the same way as Korean audiences, recognizing the power of film to transcend national borders. He also admitted to being anxious because of the increased expectations people would have over his future performances.

Kim found commercial success with his next film, Le Grand Chef, which despite opening during a slow season sold more than three million tickets to become the fourth biggest selling South Korean film of 2007. Based on a popular manhwa, the film focused on the conflict between two rival chefs, played by Kim and Im Won-hee. To prepare for his role, Kim attended cooking classes for one and a half months, and for one crucial scene in particular he visited a slaughterhouse, receiving a big shock as he knew nothing about the slaughtering process. In addition, he was required to film a number of scenes with a cow, and spent some ten days acquainting himself with it—grooming it, feeding it and taking it for walks—remarking that it was "like working with a very sensitive actress". He next starred in the crime thriller Rainbow Eyes the same year, portraying a tough detective who is also a homosexual.

In 2008, Kim took on the lead role in Marine Boy, portraying a former professional swimmer who falls into a debt trap. The same year, he starred in the short film I'm Right Here as part of the omnibus Five Senses of Eros.

Kim returned to the small screen in 2009, playing a psychopath in the action thriller The Slingshot.

Following a supporting role in Hong Sang-soo's comedy drama Hahaha, Kim starred in the remake of the 1986 Hong Kong film A Better Tomorrow.

Kim was then cast in the Japanese film Black Dawn, playing a Korean agent. He then starred in the short film The Heavenly Creature as part of Kim Jee-woon's  science-fiction anthology film Doomsday Book; and played the lead role in erotic thriller The Taste of Money by Im Sang-soo.  
Kim returned to the small screen in the romantic comedy action drama Lovers of Haeundae.

The same year, Kim published a travel book titled Two Men's Unstoppable Thailand Trip, which recorded his Thailand experience with his close friend and filmmaker, Lee Jung-sub.

Making 2013 a busy year; Kim starred in three films: fantasy thriller The Gifted Hands, romantic comedy film Marriage Blue and 3D sports comedy film Mr. Go.

Kim then starred in thriller Tabloid Truth as a talent manager, a film focusing on the tabloid culture of South Korea. He next featured in the ensemble drama Cart, a film depict a story about contract workers in a large discount store who are faced with wrongful dismissals. Meanwhile, on the small screen, Kim took on the lead role in the revenge thriller Golden Cross.

In August 2014, Kim left his previous management agency Namoo Actors, and signed with C-JeS Entertainment.

In 2015, Kim starred in the period film The Treacherous, playing a tyrant king  who exploits the populace for his own carnal pleasures. He then starred in his first cable television series; mystery thriller The Missing; followed by another thriller Goodbye Mr. Black, taking on a villainous role.

In 2016, Kim and Kim Dong-won's were double cast as Hamlet in 6th Best Theater Festival with a rewrite of Shakespeare's classic Hamlet-The Play (2016). It was directed by Kim Dong-yeon and was released to coincide with the 400th anniversary of Shakespeare's Death. It was based on the university performance Hamlet - The Story of a Sad Clown, which adapted and directed by Kim Dong-yeon in 2001. Writer Ji Seon joined the project and created the play anew after 15 years. 

In 2017, Kim starred in the science fiction drama Circle alongside Yeo Jin-goo.  
In June 2017, Kim's contract with C-JeS Entertainment expired and he decided to sign with new management agency King Entertainment.

In 2018, Kim starred in the psychological thriller The Vanished, a remake of the 2012 film The Body. The same year, he starred in the weekend drama My Contracted Husband, Mr. Oh together with Uee.

In 2019, Kim starred in the fantasy drama Item as the antagonist. and as an ex-detective in Woman of 9.9 Billion.

In 2021, he starred in a mystery-thriller film Recalled, directed by Seo Yoo-min alongside Seo Yea-ji.

Personal life
On June 18, 2010, Kim married his longtime girlfriend Han Mu-young, the elder sister of actress Han Hye-jin. Their son was born in 2011.

Filmography

Film

Television series

TV Movie

Television show

Discography

Ambassadorship 
Ambassador for Busan Contents Market (2022)

Awards and nominations

References

External links

 
 
 
 
 

21st-century South Korean male actors
South Korean male television actors
South Korean male film actors
Male actors from Seoul
Chung-Ang University alumni
1978 births
Living people